Ezra Benjamin Edelman (born August 6, 1974) is an American documentary producer and director. He won the Academy Award for Best Documentary Feature and the Primetime Emmy Award for Outstanding Directing for Nonfiction Programming for directing O.J.: Made in America (2016).

Early life and education
Edelman was born in Boston, Massachusetts. He is the son of Marian Wright Edelman, former civil rights leader and aide to Martin Luther King Jr. and founder and president of the Children's Defense Fund, and Peter Edelman, former aide to Senator Robert F. Kennedy, former Assistant Secretary of Health and Human Services for Planning and Evaluation, and professor at Georgetown University Law Center. His father is Jewish. He has two brothers, Joshua, an educational administrator, and Jonah, co-founder and CEO of Stand for Children. His parents were the third interracial marriage in Virginia after the U.S. Supreme Court outlawed the state's miscegenation law in Loving v. Virginia. 
His paternal great-grandfather was a Polish rabbi who was killed during the Holocaust and his maternal grandfather was a Baptist minister; he was raised in both faiths.

Edelman graduated from Sidwell Friends School in Washington D.C. in July 1992, before going on to earn his bachelor's degree from Yale University.

Career

Documentary projects 
Edelman is best known for producing and directing the Academy Award-winning 2016 documentary film O.J.: Made in America for ESPN's 30 for 30. In his Oscar acceptance speech, Edelman dedicated the award to Nicole Brown Simpson and Ron Goldman, whom O. J. Simpson had been tried and acquitted of murdering in 1995. Previously he directed three HBO Sports documentaries: Magic & Bird: A Courtship of Rivals, The Curious Case of Curt Flood (2011) and the Emmy Award-winning Brooklyn Dodgers: Ghosts of Flatbush. He also wrote and directed a special on the former Big East Conference called Requiem for the Big East, also a part of the 30 for 30 series. Edelman produced Wyatt Cenac's Problem Areas, an HBO documentary series that ran for two seasons.

Edelman is set to direct a Roberto Clemente biopic for Legendary Entertainment.

Personal life
Edelman lives in Brooklyn, New York City.

References

External links

Television producers from Massachusetts
American television directors
African-American television directors
African-American Jews
Living people
1974 births
Directors of Best Documentary Feature Academy Award winners
People from Boston
American people of Polish-Jewish descent
Primetime Emmy Award winners
21st-century African-American people
20th-century African-American people